Eric Oliver (born 8 July 1940) is an English former amateur footballer who played as a goalkeeper in the Football League for Darlington and in non-league football for West Auckland Town.

References

1940 births
Living people
People from Spennymoor
Footballers from County Durham
English footballers
Association football goalkeepers
West Auckland Town F.C. players
Darlington F.C. players
English Football League players